The Rolling Stones' 1965 Irish Tour was the first concert tour of Ireland by The Rolling Stones. The tour commenced on January 6 and concluded on January 8, 1965.

The Rolling Stones 
 Mick Jagger - lead vocals, harmonica, percussion
 Keith Richards - guitar, backing vocals
 Brian Jones - guitar, harmonica, backing vocals
 Bill Wyman - bass guitar, backing vocals
 Charlie Watts - drums
 Ian Stewart - piano

Tour set list
"Everybody Needs Somebody To Love" (intro)
"Pain In My Heart"
"Off The Hook"
"Route 66"
"Down The Road Apiece"
"I'm Moving On"
"Little Red Rooster"
"I'm Alright"
"The Last Time"
"Everybody Needs Somebody To Love" (full song)
"Time is On My Side"

Tour dates 
06/01/1965 Belfast, Northern Ireland, ABC Theatre (2 shows)
07/01/1965 Dublin, Ireland, Adelphi Theatre (2 shows)
08/01/1965 Cork, Ireland, Savoy Theatre (2 shows)

References 

The Complete Works of the Rolling Stones, German database link

The Rolling Stones concert tours
1965 concert tours
1965 in Ireland
Concert tours of Ireland